Acton Park is a residential / rural locality in the local government area (LGA) of Clarence in the Hobart LGA region of Tasmania. The 2021 census recorded a population of 2293 for Acton Park.

It is a rural suburb of Hobart. In 2011 there were 2165 people living in Acton Park, ten of which being Indigenous. 51.2% were male and 48.8% were female.

Acton Park is bounded to the east by the southern portion of the Meehan Range, to the south by Ralphs Bay, and to the east by Roches Beach, Single Hill and Seven Mile Beach. It is one of the more sought after living locations due to its easy commuting distance to Hobart, and because of the semi-rural character of the suburb itself.

History 
Acton Park is a confirmed locality.

Geography
The waters of Frederick Henry Bay form a small part of the eastern boundary.

Road infrastructure
Route C330 (Acton Road) runs through from north-west to south-east.

References

Localities of City of Clarence